The 1968 United States presidential election in New Jersey took place on November 5, 1968. All 50 states and the District of Columbia, were part of the 1968 United States presidential election. Voters chose 17 electors to the Electoral College, which selected the president and vice president. New Jersey was won by the Republican nominees, former Vice President Richard Nixon of California and his running mate Governor Spiro Agnew of Maryland. Nixon and Agnew defeated the Democratic nominees, incumbent Vice President Hubert H. Humphrey of Minnesota and his running mate Senator Edmund Muskie of Maine. Also in the running was the American Independent Party candidate, Governor George Wallace of Alabama, and his running mate U.S. Air Force General Curtis LeMay of California.

Nixon carried New Jersey with a plurality of 46.10% to Humphrey's 43.97%, a margin of 2.13%. In a distant third came Wallace with 9.12%. In the midst of a narrow Republican victory nationally, New Jersey voted basically how the nation voted, its result being just 1% more Republican than the national average. Despite the closeness of the statewide result, Nixon won a strong majority of the state's 21 counties, taking 14 counties, while Humphrey won 7. Humphrey kept the race fairly close by performing strongly in heavily populated core Democratic counties like Essex County, Hudson County, and Mercer County, along with winning Democratic-leaning counties like Middlesex County, Camden County, Atlantic County, and Cumberland County. Other highly populated counties like Passaic County and Union County were won by Nixon but only by narrow margins. Passaic County went to Nixon 46.3—43.1, while Union County went to Nixon by a razor-thin 45.7—45.5 margin.

Nixon was able to take the advantage statewide however with a big win in heavily populated Bergen County, taking 54.5% of the vote there, along with wins in several other fairly populated suburban counties like Monmouth County and Morris County, as well as winning many rural counties. Nixon's strongest county by vote share was rural Sussex County, where he received 61.7% of the vote to Humphrey's 28.5%. Humphrey's strongest county by vote share was urban Essex County, where he received 51.9% of the vote to Nixon's 39.2%.

George Wallace, running on a Southern populist platform, finished a distant third in New Jersey, with a single-digit vote share percentage. But this was still a surprisingly strong performance for Wallace in a Northeastern state like New Jersey. Discounting the border states of Maryland and Delaware, Wallace's 9.12% in New Jersey was the highest statewide vote share he received out of any Northeastern state. Wallace performed most strongly in South Jersey, where he broke into double-digit support in several counties. Wallace's strongest county was Gloucester County, a rural county in the southwestern portion of the state by the Delaware border, where he received 15.5% of the vote.

Nixon's victory was the first of six consecutive Republican victories in the state, as New Jersey would not vote for a Democratic candidate again until Bill Clinton in 1992. Nixon became the first ever Republican to win the White House without carrying Atlantic or Cumberland Counties, as well as the first to do so without carrying Middlesex County since Benjamin Harrison in 1888.

Results

Results by county

See also
 United States presidential elections in New Jersey
 Presidency of Richard Nixon

Notes

References

New Jersey
1968
1968 New Jersey elections